The 2020 Cork Intermediate A Football Championship was the 85th staging of the Cork Intermediate A Football Championship since its establishment by the Cork County Board in 1909. The draw for the group stage placings took place on 19 November 2019. The championship was scheduled to begin in April 2020, however, it was postponed indefinitely due to the 2020 coronavirus pandemic in Ireland. The championship eventually began on 24 July 2020, after being suspended once again on 5 October 2020, eventually ended on 21 August 2021.

The final was played on 21 August 2021 at Mallow GAA Complex, between Rockchapel and Mitchelstown, in what was their first meeting in the final. Rockchapel won the match by 1-10 to 0-09 to claim their second championship title overall and their first since 1989.

Mitchelstown's Cathail O'Mahony was the championship's top scorer with 5-29.

Format change

On 26 March 2019, three championship proposals were circulated to Cork club delegates. A core element running through all three proposals, put together by the Cork GAA games workgroup, was that there be a group stage of 12 teams and straight relegation and promotion. On 2 April 2019, a majority of 136 club delegates voted for Option A which will see one round of games played in April and two more in August – all with county players available.

Fixtures/results

Group 1

Table

Results

Group 2

Table

Results

Group 3

Table

Results

Group 4

Table

Results

Knock-out stage

Relegation playoff

Quarter-finals

Semi-finals

Final

Championship statistics

Top scorers

Overall

In a single game

References

External links
 Cork GAA website

Cork Intermediate Football Championship